Tone Poems 2 is an album by American mandolinist David Grisman and British guitarist Martin Taylor that was released in 1995 by Grisman's label, Acoustic Music. It is a sequel to  Tone Poems, his collaboration with bluegrass guitarist Tony Rice. This is a jazz-oriented recording on which Grisman and Taylor play a variety of vintage, fretted, acoustic instruments. They use 41 guitars, mandolins, mandolas, mandocellos, and tenor guitars.

Track listing
 "Swanee" (George Gershwin, Irving Caesar) – 4:22
 "Teasin' the Frets" (Nick Lucas) – 1:53
 "It Had to Be You" (Isham Jones, Gus Kahn) – 3:15
 "Please" (Ralph Rainger, Leo Robin) – 3:14
 "Mood Indigo" (Duke Ellington,  Barney Bigard, Irving Mills) – 3:09
 "Anything Goes" (Cole Porter) – 2:06
 "Blue Moon" (Richard Rodgers, Lorenz Hart) – 4:24
 "Lulu's Back In Town" (Harry Warren, Al Dubin) – 2:59
 "Tears" (Stéphane Grappelli, Django Reinhardt) – 3:10
 "Jeepers Creepers" (Warren, Johnny Mercer) – 2:57
 "Over the Rainbow" (Harold Arlen, E. Y. Harburg) – 4:18
 "Musette for a Magpie" (Martin Taylor) – 3:16
 "Mairzy Doats" (Milton Drake, Al Hoffman, and Jerry Livingston) – 2:16
 "Bésame Mucho" (Consuelo Velázquez,  Sunny Skylar) – 4:41
 "Unforgettable" (Irving Gordon) – 3:07
 "Here's That Rainy Day" (Jimmy Van Heusen, Johnny Burke) – 3:26
 "My Romance" (Rodgers, Hart) – 4:02
 "Out of Nowhere" (Johnny Green, Edward Heyman) – 3:44
 "Crystal Silence" (Chick Corea, Neville Potter) – 3:38

Personnel
 David Grisman – mandolin, mandola, mandocello, guitar, tenor guitar
 Martin Taylor – guitar

References

1995 albums
David Grisman albums
Acoustic Disc albums